Buffaloed is a 2019 American comedy film directed by Tanya Wexler and written by Brian Sacca. It stars Zoey Deutch, Judy Greer, Jermaine Fowler, Noah Reid, and Jai Courtney. 
The film tells the story of a paroled convict who will do anything to escape Buffalo, New York. Hustling for money and crippled by debt, she decides to become a debt collector herself. 

The film had its world premiere at the Tribeca Film Festival on April 27, 2019, and was released in select theatres and on demand on February 14, 2020, by Magnolia Pictures. The film was met with generally positive reviews from critics.

Plot 
Peg Dahl is born in Buffalo, New York to a poor, blue-collar family. Disappointed in her family's financial situation and inspired by her late father's tendency to hustle, she looks for ways to make money. Through her childhood she studies economics and works small money-making schemes with a plan to attend an Ivy League school and work on Wall Street.

When Peg gets into a good college but can't afford it, she begins selling counterfeit tickets to Bills games. She is eventually caught and is sentenced to forty months in prison. When Peg is released from prison she first works at her brother J.J.'s bar cleaning toilets. But then she hustles the local debt collection firm to erase her own legal debt by working for them. She rises to the top but is cheated by the owner of the firm.

At the bar Graham, who works for the DA and is investigating the shady debt collection racket in Buffalo, and Peg connect. They sneak out during a bar brawl and she takes him to her place. She tells him she's quitting her job, so they exchange info and then sleep together.

The next morning Peg announces she's going to start her own debt collection business, but legit, based on intel Graham provided her. She recruits fellow hustlers, from phone sex operators to Asian business owners and a fellow parolee. The idea is like sales, the pitch she gives them is to free people from the pressures of debt.  

Peg's firm is successful, but constant sabotage and veiled threats haunt her and pressure builds between her and her former employer. She takes her employees' commissions, reinvesting it in the company. Her former boss, Wizz, not only destroys her offices, but creates problems in her personal life, like taking her brother's bar from him. 

Inviting J.J. to dinner, he gets mad when Peg asks him what he's heard from Wizz, as he's often in the bar. J.J. gets up and leaves. However he does stand up to Wizz, who first roughs him up and then gets her family arrested, her mom for hairdressing off the books. Peg loses it, going to Wizz'es premises. She coaxes him out by firing shots into the air, then they physically fight, but the cops stop them; arresting her for setting off the firearm. 

Peg and her mom talk in an interrogation room, and she gets called out for always going for money making schemes and not trying to earn money honestly. In court, Peg takes a deal and works with the police to take down the other debt collection agencies. 

Uniting the citywide collection agencies at J.J.'s bar, Peg gets them on tape confessing some of their shadier business practices while their offices are raided by the cops. Forty-two people are arrested for illegal debt collecting and before being taken back into custody, she burns over 50 thousand debt sheets equivalent to over one billion in debt. Peg is put in prison for destruction of evidence, where she teaches the other inmates finance as part of her plea deal. 

Peg is eventually released from prison and returns to her family and friends, who give her seed money to start over. She decides to tackle hedge funds.

Cast

Production
In July 2018, it was announced Zoey Deutch and Jermaine Fowler had joined the cast of the film, with Tanya Wexler directing from a screenplay by Brian Sacca. In August 2018, Judy Greer joined the cast of the film.

Principal photography began on July 24, 2018, in Toronto, Canada. Production concluded on August 23, 2018.

Release
The film had its world premiere at the Tribeca Film Festival on April 27, 2019. Shortly after, Magnolia Pictures acquired distribution rights to the film and later released it on February 14, 2020. It also had a special screening at the Buffalo International Film Festival on October 13, 2019.

Reception

Box office
, Buffaloed has grossed $25,383 domestically.

Critical response
The website's critics consensus reads, "This late-capitalism comedy is undeniably uneven, but Zoey Deutch's effervescent performance gives Buffaloed wings." On Metacritic, the film has a weighted average score of 61 out of 100, based on 13 critics, indicating "generally favorable reviews".

References

External links
 

2019 films
2019 comedy-drama films
2010s American films
2010s crime comedy-drama films
American crime comedy-drama films
American independent films
Films directed by Tanya Wexler
Films produced by Mason Novick
Films scored by Matthew Margeson
Films set in Buffalo, New York
Films shot in Toronto
2019 independent films
2010s English-language films
American business films
Cultural depictions of fraudsters
Films about finance